Mischief Night is an informal holiday on which children, teenagers and adults engage in jokes, pranks, vandalism, or parties. It is known by a variety of names including Devil's Night, Gate Night, Goosey Night, Moving Night, Cabbage Night, Mystery Night and Mat Night.

Historical background
The earliest reference to Mischief Night is from 1790 when a headmaster encouraged a school play which ended in "an Ode to Fun which praises children's tricks on Mischief Night in most approving terms". 

In some regions in England, these pranks were originally carried out as part of the May Day celebrations, but shifted to later in the year, dates varying in different areas, some marking it traditionally on 4th November, the night before bonfire night or the 30th October the night before Halloween though the latter is marked traditionally nowadays.

According to one historian, "May Day and the Green Man had little resonance for children in grimy cities. They looked at the opposite end of the year and found the ideal time, the night before the Gunpowder Plot." However, the shift only happened in the late 19th century and is described by the Opies as "one of the mysteries of the folklore calendar".

Naming variations

In the United States and Canada
In most of New Jersey, and other regions of the United States, including New Orleans, Philadelphia, the Lehigh Valley region of eastern Pennsylvania, Delaware, parts of New York state, and Connecticut, it is referred to as "Mischief Night" or, particularly in the Great Lakes region, "Devil's Night". In some towns in North Jersey and parts of New York State, it is also known as "Goosey Night" and "Cabbage Night".

In Baltimore, Maryland, it has traditionally been referred to as "Moving Night" due to the custom of exchanging or stealing porch furniture and other outside items.

In Detroit, which was particularly affected by Devil's Night arson and vandalism throughout the 1980s, many citizens take it upon themselves to patrol the streets to deter arsonists and those who may break the law. This is known as "Angels' Night". Some 40,000 volunteer citizens patrol the city on Angels' Night, which usually runs October 29 through October 31, around the time most Halloween festivities are taking place.

In rural Niagara Falls, Ontario, during the 1950s and 1960s, Cabbage Night referred to the custom of raiding local gardens for leftover rotting cabbages and hurling them about to cause mischief in the neighbourhood. Today, the night is still celebrated in Ontario but is also commonly known as "Cabbage Night" in parts of the United States areas of Vermont; Connecticut; Bergen County, New Jersey; Upstate New York; Northern Kentucky; Newport, Rhode Island; and Western Massachusetts.

It is known as "Gate Night" in New Hampshire, West Kootenay (British Columbia), Vancouver Island, Winnipeg, Thunder Bay (Ontario), Bay City (Michigan), Rockland County (New York), North Dakota and South Dakota; as "Mat Night" in English-speaking Quebec where a tradition of stealing front door mats developed; and as "Devil's Night" in many places throughout Canada, Michigan, western New York, and western Pennsylvania.

In the United Kingdom

In some parts of the country, "Mischief Night" is held on 30 October, the night before Halloween. The separation of Halloween tricks from treats seems to have only developed in certain areas, often appearing in one region but not at all nearby regions.

Mischief Night is known in Yorkshire as "Mischievous Night" or the shortened "'Chievous Night" "Miggy Night", "Tick-Tack Night", "Corn Night", "Trick Night" or "Micky Night" and is celebrated across Northern England on 4 November the night before Bonfire Night. In some areas of Yorkshire, it is extremely popular among 13-year-olds, as they believe it to be a sort of "coming of age ceremony".

In and around the city of Liverpool, Mischief Night is known locally as "Mizzy Night"; trouble areas were being patrolled by the Merseyside Police in 2015.

It is known in Welsh as Noson Ddrygioni and in Scottish Gaelic as Oidhche nan Cleas.

Modern practice

In the United States
Mischief Night is generally recognized as a New Jersey, Pennsylvania, Connecticut, Maryland and Delaware, phenomenon.

Mischief Night tends to include popular tricks such as toilet papering yards and buildings, powder-bombing and egging cars, people, and homes, using soap to write on windows, 'forking' yards, setting off fireworks and smashing pumpkins and jack-o'-lanterns.  Local grocery stores often refuse to sell eggs to children and teenagers around the time of Halloween for this reason.  Occasionally the damage can escalate to include the spray-painting of buildings and homes. Less destructive is the prank known as "Knock, Knock, Ginger".

In New Orleans, from 2014 to 2018, Mischief Night involved a series of unruly parade-like riots. According to participants, the Mischief Night 'krewes' follow in New Orleans' carnival's centuries-old tradition of 'walking parades', most of which take place in the lead-up to Mardi Gras. Mixing revelry with mindless violence, Mischief Night parades involve thematic floats and costumes as well as targeted vandalism and fires. Targets of vandalism, attacks and arson have included the police, bystanders and property.

When asked in an interview from 2017 how Mischief Night in New Orleans fits into the context of carnival, a parader replied "Our Carnival traditions are those that actually want to 'turn the world upside down.'" After a parade through downtown in 2016 that saw bonfires in the street, police cars hit with paint and a now-removed white supremacist monument chipped away at with a sledgehammer, another participant wrote: 

 
In some areas of Queens, New York, Cabbage Night has included throwing rotten fruit at neighbors, cars and buses. Children and teenagers fill eggs with Neet and Nair hair remover and throw them at unsuspecting individuals. In the mid-1980s garbage was set on fire and cemeteries were set ablaze. In Camden, New Jersey, Mischief Night escalated to the point that in the 1990s widespread arson was committed, with more than 130 arson attacks on the night of October 30, 1991.

Word of Mischief Night began to appear in U.S. newspapers in the 1930s and 1940s and told of those who were celebrating wanting to put distance between the wholesome night of trick or treating and the chaotic night of causing havoc around the town. Some believed that the stress of the Great Depression was causing people to act out and this is what caused Mischief night to break out at that time.

In popular culture
In the 1994 film The Crow, the protagonist and his fiancée are murdered on the eve of their Halloween wedding on "Devil's Night" by a street gang on the orders of Detroit's most notorious crime lord, Top Dollar. With the help of a mystical crow, Eric returns from the grave on "Devil's Night" one year later to exact revenge against the crime lord and his henchmen.
A 1999 episode of Rocket Power explores the joys of Mischief Night in The Night Before.
A 2006 film, Mischief Night, is based on events surrounding this night in Leeds, U.K.
A horror film was released in 2013, Mischief Night, directed by Richard Schenkman. 
A different horror film was released in 2014, also called Mischief Night and directed by Travis Baker.
Orange is the New Black: In season 6, episode 5, the main characters are subjected to pranks throughout the episode because of "Mischief Night".
Are You Afraid of the Dark?, season 1 episode 4 "The Tale of the Twisted Claw" opens on Mischief Night and plays an important role in the plot of the episode.
 NCIS Season 7 Episode 5 "Code of Conduct", the dead body of a prankster is found on Mischief Night.

See also
 List of practical joke topics

References

External links
 Confessions from a Mischief Night brat  BBC Yorkshire report — November 2006
 Police Patrol for Mischief Night BBC Merseyside report — November 2006
 Dialect Survey Results US terms;prevalence and distribution

Autumn traditions
British culture
Crime
Halloween
October observances
November observances
Unofficial observances
Culture of Philadelphia
New Jersey culture
Delaware Valley
Culture of the Lehigh Valley
Culture of Wilmington, Delaware
Culture of Atlantic City, New Jersey
Practical jokes
Parties